Stenocotis is a genus of leafhoppers in the family Cicadellidae.

References 

 

Ledrinae
Cicadellidae genera